The Prince Claus Conservatoire is one of the nine conservatoires in the Netherlands. It is a constituent of the Hanze University of Applied Sciences in Groningen.

Students normally specialize in one instrument within the classical or jazz music division. Students can also train to become conductors, composers, and music teachers.

Teachers
Classical
Paul Komen
Tamara Poddubnaya
Bart van de Roer
Nata Tsvereli
Theo Jellema
Wolfgang Zerer
Johan Hofmann
Jan van Zelm
Manon Heijne
Jan Louwerse.nl Egbert Jan Louwerse
Thies Roorda
Frank Mulder
Reinier Hogerheyde
Marije van der Ende
Peter Stam
Jan Schoemaker
Frank Brouns
Auke van der Merk
Hessel Buma
Jilt Jansma
Dick Bolt
Ane Travaille
Joeke Hoekstra
Luuk Nagtegaal
Manja Smits
Ilona Sie Dhian Ho
Sonja van Beek
Veselina Manikova
Kati Sebestyen
Romana Porumb
Ervin Schiffer
Gisella Bergman
Jan Ype Nota
Michel Strauss
Corine 't Hoen
Sorin Orcinschi

Mark Vondenhoff is the head of the Classical Department.

Jazz
 Joris Teepe (nl)
 Mark Haanstra (de)
 Jan Voogd
 Koos Wiltenburg (nl)
 Freddie Bryant
 Winfred Buma
 Jonathan Kreisberg
 Frank Wingold
 David Berkman
 Marc van Roon
 Jasper Soffers
 Don Braden
 Michael Moore
 Miguel Martinez
 Ralph Peterson
 Steve Altenberg
 Joost van Schaik
 Sam Burtis
 Jilt Jansma
 Brian Lynch
 Cajan Witmer
 Kurt Weiss
 Dena DeRose
 Francien van Tuinen
 Floor van Zutphen

Joris Teepe (nl) is the head of the Jazz Program.

Conducting—Choir
Louis Buskens

Conducting—Wind Band
Tijmen Botma
Klaas van der Woude

Composition, Music & Studio Productions

Music in Education
Kees van der Meer
Lieuwe Noordam
Aletta Kwant
Floor Pots
Marinus Verkuil

Marinus Verkuil is the head of the Music in Education department.

Other subjects
 Geert-Jan van Bergen Beieren en Henegouwen
 Wiebe Buis
 Karolien Dons
 Remco de Haan
 Leendert Runia
 Ruurd Salverda
 Johannes Terpstra
 Sietze de Vries

Alumni

Former teachers

Wieke Karsten
Sabrina Vlaškalić

References

External links
 Official website

Music schools in the Netherlands
Hanze University of Applied Sciences